The awards were announced by minister A.K Balan in Thiruvananthapuram on 7 March 2017. The winners in the fiction category were selected by a jury headed by Odisha director A.K. Bir. The other jury members were Priyanandanan, Sundar Das, Sudevan, script writer P.F. Mathews, actor Shanti Krishna, composer and singer V.T. Murali, sound designer Arun Nambiar, critic Dr Meena T. Pillai and Kerala Chalachitra Academy secretary Mahesh Panju.

Winners

References

External links 
 http://www.keralafilm.com

Kerala State Film Awards
2016 Indian film awards